Wiraqucha (Quechua, hispanicized and mixed spellings Hueracocha, Hueraccocha, Huiracocha, Huiraccocha, Huirajocha, Viracocha, Wiraccocha, Wiracocha) may refer to:

 Viracocha, an Andean divinity 
 Viracocha Inca, eighth Sapa Inka (emperor) of the Tawantinsuyu
 Wiraqucha (Cusco), a mountain in the Cusco Region, Peru
 Wiraqucha (Junín), a mountain in the Junín Region, Peru
 Wiraqucha Pirqa
 Luis Viracocha (born 1954)
 Viracocha Patera